Esteban Eduardo González Herrera (born 22 May 1982) is a Chilean football manager and former footballer who played as a midfielder.

Club career
Chino González began his playing career with Deportes Concepción in 2001. He has also played for Cobreloa, Deportes Concepción, Palestino, Deportes Puerto Montt, Rangers and Ñublense.

In 2004, he was part of the Cobreloa squad that won the Chilean league championship.

He joined Unión Española in January 2010.

O'Higgins

On 18 June 2015, he joining in O'Higgins for the 2014-15 season.

Managerial career
In 2018, González became the manager of Deportes Concepción in the Tercera B, the fifth level of the Chilean football league system. He got promotion on two consecutive occasions in both  and  seasons, leaving the team in November 2020 when it was in the Segunda División Profesional. From 2021 to 2022 he worked as the assistant coach of Óscar del Solar for the same team.

In August 2022, he joined Coquimbo Unido technical staff as the assistant coach of Fernando Díaz.

Personal life
He is nicknamed Chino (Chinese) due to his resemblance with the asian people.

Honours

Club
Cobreloa
Primera División de Chile: 2004 Clausura

References

External links
 
 
 Esteban González at playmakerstats.com (English version of ceroacero.es)

1982 births
Living people
Footballers from Santiago
Chilean footballers
Association football midfielders
Deportes Concepción (Chile) footballers
Cobreloa footballers
Club Deportivo Palestino footballers
Puerto Montt footballers
Rangers de Talca footballers
Ñublense footballers
Unión Española footballers
Universidad de Concepción footballers
C.D. Antofagasta footballers
C.D. Huachipato footballers
O'Higgins F.C. footballers
Chilean Primera División players
Chilean football managers
Deportes Concepción (Chile) managers
Segunda División Profesional de Chile managers